Carposina pygmaeella is a moth of the family Carposinidae. It was first described by Lord Walsingham in 1907. It is endemic to the island of Hawaii.

The wingspan is about 6 mm, making it the smallest Hawaiian Carposinidae species.

References

Carposinidae
Endemic moths of Hawaii
Moths described in 1907
Taxa named by Thomas de Grey, 6th Baron Walsingham